The South American Youth Championship 1988 was held in Buenos Aires, Argentina. It also served as qualification for the 1989 FIFA World Youth Championship.

Teams
The following teams entered the tournament:

  (host)
 
 
 
 
 
  (invited)

First round

Group A

Group B

Final round

Qualification to World Youth Championship
The three best performing teams qualified for the 1989 FIFA World Youth Championship.

External links
Results by RSSSF

1988
Football in Buenos Aires
1987–88 in Argentine football
International association football competitions hosted by Argentina
1988 in youth association football